Shakti TV is a 24-hour Hindi health and yoga television channel owned by health channel Agricultural Broadcasting Corporation Pvt. Ltd.

It is a Sri Lanka soap Opera channel which airs Nandhini

Hindi-language television channels in India
Television channels and stations established in 1998